PremPlus (originally Premiership Plus) was Sky Sports' first and only pay-per-view channel which was dedicated to airing live and interactive football from the Premier League. The main presenter on PremPlus was Marcus Buckland with former Arsenal manager George Graham, providing punditry.

History 
PremPlus was launched on 19 August 2001, showing 40 pay-per-view matches from the Premier League. The first match featured Chelsea v Newcastle United. The name Premiership Plus had run throughout the 2001–02, 2002–03 and 2003–04 seasons before being shortened to PremPlus for the beginning of the 2004–05 season. Also, from the start of 2004–05, PremPlus showed 50 live PPV matches, an increase of 10 compared to previous seasons.

Matches could be purchased simply by telephone or, in later seasons, interactively through the TV, and a season ticket for all matches in a season was available at a substantial discount.

Pre-match coverage was shown free to air, with the channel blacking out to non-paying viewers approximately five minutes prior to kick-off. The host would repeatedly exhort viewers during this time to purchase the match.

There was a PremPlus 2 channel, but was only shown on NTL. It closed when PremPlus stopped broadcasting in 2007. In 2006, PremPlus HD launched with the other HD channels on Sky. It was replaced by Sky Sports HDX when PremPlus stopped broadcasting.

PremPlus failed to live up to Sky's expectations as few British football fans were willing to pay for individual matches on top of paying a monthly subscription for other matches. After six seasons on air it closed down at the end of the 2006–07 season, when EU competition laws forced Sky to break its monopoly on the Premier League, having broadcast 270 matches live and exclusive from the Premier League. The last ever game shown on PremPlus was Aston Villa v Sheffield United. This marked the end, at least for the time being, of attempts to introduce pay-per-view into the British sports television market, outside of occasional combat sports (wrestling, boxing, and MMA) events.

In October 2020, with football fans unable to attend matches due to the COVID-19 pandemic, Sky Sports and BT Sport were given the rights to broadcast football matches in the UK on their respective PPV channels, Sky Sports Box Office and BT Sport Box Office — additional matches that were not initially planned to be shown on TV.

References

Sky Sports
Pay-per-view television channels in the United Kingdom
Premier League on television
Defunct television channels in the United Kingdom